Abraham A. Palmer is an American behavior geneticist and Professor & Vice Chair for Basic Research in the Department of Psychiatry at the University of California, San Diego. In 2020, he was named a fellow of the American Association for the Advancement of Science. He is also a fellow of the International Behavioural and Neural Genetics Society (IBANGS) and the American College of Neuropsychopharmacology, and received the IBANGS Distinguished Investigator Award in 2020.

References

External links
Lab website
Faculty profile at UCSD website

Living people
American geneticists
Behavior geneticists
University of California, San Diego faculty
University of Chicago alumni
University of California, San Diego alumni
Fellows of the American Association for the Advancement of Science
Year of birth missing (living people)